Soligny-la-Trappe is a commune in the Orne department in north-western France.

Soligny-la-Trappe is the location of La Trappe Abbey, where the Cistercian Order of the Strict Observance, or Trappists, was founded in 1664 by a converted courtier named Armand Jean le Bouthillier de Rancé.

See also
Communes of the Orne department

References

External links

 Official Web site

Solignylatrappe